Haydar Shesho is a Yazidi military commander in Iraq. He is the founder and supreme commander of the Yazidi self-defense militia Protection Force of Ezidkhan (HPÊ).

Life 
Shesho's family emigrated from Iraq under Saddam Hussein in 1990 to Germany and became German citizens. Until summer 2014 they lived in Bad Oeynhausen, Germany. At the onset of the August 2014 Sinjar massacre, together with his uncle Qasim Shesho and several cousins, he returned to Iraq to help protect his Yazidi homeland.

Starting with a handful of fighters, he founded the Protection Force of Sinjar, which has about 2,500 fighters. While he and his uncle, dubbed "The lion of Sinjar," were known to be supportive of the Kurdistan Regional Government and Iraqi Kurdish president Barzani's Kurdistan Democratic Party, he refused to pledge allegiance and publicly insisted they "fight only for Yazidis, not for any party." Subsequently, Haydar Shesho was arrested on 5 April 2015 by Iraqi Kurdish forces for "creating an illegitimate new militia." He was released a week later after it was negotiated that he would register in the Ministry of Peshmerga.

See also 
List of Yazidi organizations
List of Yazidi people

References 

20th-century births
Living people
Iraqi Yazidis
German Yazidis
Iraqi emigrants to Germany
Naturalized citizens of Germany
Year of birth missing (living people)